Computer literacy is defined as the knowledge and ability to use computers and related technology efficiently, with skill levels ranging from elementary use to computer programming and advanced problem solving. Computer literacy can also refer to the comfort level someone has with using computer programs and applications. Another valuable component is understanding how computers work and operate. An individual's level of computer literacy is measured on the scale of how skilled they are when it comes to using computers and other related tools to achieve a goal. Computer literacy may be distinguished from computer programming, which primarily focuses on the design and coding of computer programs rather than the familiarity and skill in their use. Various countries, including the United Kingdom and the United States, have created initiatives to improve national computer literacy rates.

Background 
Computer literacy differs from digital literacy, which is the ability to communicate or find information on digital platforms. Comparatively, computer literacy measures the ability to use computers and to maintain a basic understanding of how they operate.

A person's computer literacy is commonly measured through questionnaires, which test their ability to write and modify text, trouble-shoot minor computer operating issues, and organize and analyze information on a computer.

To increase their computer literacy, computer users should distinguish which computer skills they want to improve, and learn to be more purposeful and accurate in their use of these skills. By learning more about computer literacy, users can discover more computer functions that are worth using.

Arguments for the use of computers in classroom settings, and thus for the promotion of computer literacy, are primarily vocational or practical. Computers are essential in the modern-day workplace. The instruction of computer literacy in education is intended to provide students with employable skills.

Rapid changes in technology make it difficult to predict the next five years of computer literacy. Computer literacy projects have support in many countries because they conform to general political and economic principles of those countries' public and private organizations. The Internet offers great potential for the effective and widespread dissemination of knowledge and for the integration of technological advances. Improvements in computer literacy facilitate this.

History 
The term "computer literacy" is usually attributed to Arthur Luehrmann, a physicist at Dartmouth College who was a colleague of Kemeny and Kurtz who introduced the BASIC programming language in 1964. Luehrmann became a tireless advocate of computers in teaching. At an April 1972 American Federation of Information Processing Societies (AFIPS) conference, Luehrmann gave a talk titled "Should the computer teach the student, or vice-versa?" The paper is available online. In it he notes:

In 1978, Andrew Molnar was director of the Office of Computing Activities at the National Science Foundation in the United States. Shortly after its formation, computer literacy was discussed in several academic articles. In 1985 the Journal of Higher Education asserted that being computer literate involved mastering word processing, spreadsheet programs, and retrieving and sharing information on a computer.

France 
Plan Calcul was a French governmental program in the 1960s to promote a national or European computer industry that was accompanied with a vast educational effort in programming and computer science.

The Computing for All plan was a French government initiative to introduce computers to all the country's pupils in 1985.

United Kingdom 
In the United Kingdom, a number of prominent video game developers emerged in the late 1970s and early 1980s. The ZX Spectrum, released in 1982, helped to popularize home computing, coding and gaming in Britain and Europe.

The BBC Computer Literacy Project, using the BBC Micro computer, ran from 1980 to 1989. This initiative educated a generation of coders in schools and at home, before the development of mass market PCs in the 1990s. 'Bedroom computer innovation' led to the development of early web-hosting companies aimed at businesses and individuals in the 1990s.

The BBC Computer Literacy Project 2012 was an initiative to develop students' marketable information technology and computer science skills.

Computer programming skills were introduced into the National Curriculum in 2014.

It was reported in 2017 that roughly 11.5 million United Kingdom citizens did not have basic computer literacy skills. In response, the United Kingdom government published a 'digital skills strategy' in 2017.

First released in 2012, the Raspberry Pi is a series of low-cost single-board computers originally intended to promote the teaching of basic computer science in schools in the UK. Later, they became far more popular than anticipated, and have been used in a wide variety of applications. The Raspberry Pi Foundation promotes the teaching of elementary computer science in UK schools and in developing countries.

United States 
In 1978, the National Science Foundation put out a call to educate young people in computer programming. To introduce students to computing, the U.S. government, private foundations and universities combined to fund and staff summer programs for high school students.

Students in the United States are introduced to tablet computers in preschool or kindergarten. Tablet computers are preferred for their small size and touchscreens. The touch user interface of a tablet computer is more accessible to the under-developed motor skills of young children. Early childhood educators use student-centered instruction to guide young students through various activities on the tablet computer. This typically includes Internet browsing and the use of applications, familiarizing the young student with a basic level of computer proficiency.

A concern raised within this topic of discussion is that primary and secondary education teachers are often not equipped with the skills to teach basic computer literacy.

In the United States job market, computer illiteracy severely limits employment options. Non-profit organizations such as Per Scholas attempt to reduce the divide by offering free and low-cost computers to children and their families in under-served communities in South Bronx, New York, Miami, Florida, and in Columbus, Ohio.

Worldwide Computer Literacy Rates

Computer literacy world averages, as determined by The World Economic Forum found that the OECD countries are not as computer literate as one would expect since 25% of individuals do not know how to use a computer, at least 45% rate poorly, and only 30% rate as moderately to strongly computer literate.

See also 

 Computational literacy
 
 Digital divide
 Digital literacy
 Information literacies
 Transliteracy
 Web literacy

Computers
 BBC Micro
 OLPC XO
 Raspberry Pi

Initiatives
 BBC Computer Literacy Project 2012
 European Computer Driving Licence
 One Laptop per Child

References

Further reading